Jean-Manuel Mbom (born 24 February 2000) is a German professional footballer who plays as a midfielder for Werder Bremen. He has represented Germany internationally at various youth levels.

Career
Mbom made his professional debut for KFC Uerdingen in the 3. Liga on 21 July 2019, starting in the home match against Hallescher FC before being substituted out in the 55th minute for Dennis Daube, with the match finishing as a 1–0 win.

Mbom made his Bundesliga debut on the 2020–21 season's second matchday on 26 September 2020, in a 3–1 win away to Schalke 04. He started the match and played on the right side of midfield.

Personal life
Mbom was born in Bovenden, Lower Saxony and is of Cameroonian descent.

Career statistics

Honours
Individual
 Fritz Walter Medal U17 Silver: 2017

References

External links
 
 
 

2000 births
Living people
People from Göttingen (district)
Sportspeople from Göttingen
German people of Cameroonian descent
German sportspeople of African descent
German footballers
Footballers from Lower Saxony
Association football midfielders
Germany under-21 international footballers
Germany youth international footballers
Bundesliga players
2. Bundesliga players
3. Liga players
Regionalliga players
SV Werder Bremen II players
SV Werder Bremen players
KFC Uerdingen 05 players